The Steppes electoral district was a constituency created for the 1917 Russian Constituent Assembly election. The electoral district covered the Akmolinsk Oblast and the Semipalatinsk Oblast. According to Wade (2004), it is unclear whether the election was carried through to completion in the electoral district.

Lists in the fray
Fourteen lists contested the election in the Steppes;
No. 1 - Cossacks
No. 2 - Clergy and laity
No. 3 - Bolsheviks
No. 4 - Internationalists
No. 5 - Alash
No. 6 - Kadets
No. 7 - Tatars
No. 8 - Socialist-Revolutionaries
No. 9 - Socialist Cossacks
No. 10 - United Socialists
No. 11 - Kirghiz Socialists
No. 12 - Germans
No. 13 - Muslim Democrats
No. 14 - Clergy and Laity of Petropavlovsk

Campaigning

Bolshevik Party
The Bolshevik list (no. 3) included V.M. Kosarev, A.A. Zvezdov, V.V. Tarakanov and V.S. Gorshkov as some of its candidates. The Omsk Soviet of Workers and Soldiers Deputies appealed to workers and peasants to vote for the Bolshevik list. Bolshevik agitations called for established of soviet power whilst campaigning for the Constituent Assembly ballot. The newspaper Revolyotsionnaya mysl' ('Revolutionary Thought') played an important role in the Bolshevik campaign.

Attempting to break the SR monopoly among the peasantry, the Bolsheviks in Omsk sent out some twenty railway workshop labourers and twenty soldiers to Akmolinsk Oblast and Tobolsk Governorate (being a separate electoral district) to campaign among the peasants.

Socialist-Revolutionary Party
In the run up to the elections, the Socialist-Revolutionary Party was split as an Omsk-based left-wing group led by N. Ishmaev broke away. However, even after the departure of the leftists the SRs suffered internal divisions. On October 17, 1917 the West Siberian Soviet of Peasants Deputies Executive Committee held a meeting and decided to field the right-wing SR leader P. Derber as candidate for the Constituent Assembly election. But a group of right-wing SRs in the Omsk Provincial SR Party Council opposed Derber's candidature, arguing that his moral standing was questionable.

The West Siberian Soviet of Peasants Deputies received a major financial boost from the Ministry of Education, which provided some 3 million Russian rubles for anti-Bolshevik agitation in the lead up to the vote.

Results
The account of U.S. historian Oliver Henry Radkey, used as source for the results table below, only includes votes from Omsk and surroundings.

This account of the vote in  comes from the work of Soviet historian L. M. Spirin.

References

Electoral districts of the Russian Constituent Assembly election, 1917